The 2020 Milwaukee mayoral election was held on Tuesday, April 7, 2020, to elect the mayor for Milwaukee.

Municipal elections in Wisconsin are non-partisan. The non-partisan primary was held on Tuesday, February 18, 2020, to narrow the field of candidates to two.

Incumbent mayor Tom Barrett won reelection against state senator Lena Taylor in the general election.

Primary election

Candidates

On ballot
 Tom Barrett, incumbent mayor
 Paul Rasky
Lena Taylor, State Senator from the 4th District
 Tony Zielinski, alderman from the 14th district

Write-in candidates
David D. King, candidate for District 9 Milwaukee city councilor in 2016 
Ramone Williams

Withdrawn or rejected
 Daniel Crowley
 Theresa Garner
 David D. King, candidate for District 9 Milwaukee city councilor in 2016 subsequently ran as write-in
 Tremell Noble, applicant to fill the Milwaukee County Sheriff vacancy in 2017
 Ramone Williams subsequently ran as write-in

Declined
Ashanti Hamilton, Milwaukee Common Council president

Endorsements

Polls

Results

General election
A general election was held April 7 between Tom Barrett and Lena Taylor.

Barret's campaign was largely focused on his track record. Taylor challenged his track record, arguing that people of color had not sufficiently benefited from during tenure.

Impact of the COVID-19 pandemic

On March 23, citing concerns of the COVID-19 pandemic in the United States, Mayor Barrett sent a letter to Governor Tony Evers, State Senate Majority Leader Scott L. Fitzgerald and Speaker of the State House Robin Vos, requesting that the April 7 elections (including the mayoral election, as well as Wisconsin's presidential primaries and others races) be conducted using mail-in ballots only.

City officials urged voters not to vote in person and to instead vote by mail with absentee ballots. On March 31, Milwaukee Election Commission Executive Director Neil Albrecht announced that rather than the usual 180 voting sites, the election will instead have only between ten and twelve in-person voting sites. This was due to a severe lack of poll workers. By April 3, the number of in-person polling places was further reduced to only five. Ultimately, 96,712 absentee ballots were requested, and 77,729 were returned (it is not yet reported how many are valid).

On April 1, Judge William M. Conley ruled that, due to the circumstances of the elections, absentee ballots would be allowed to be returned until April 13, despite the elections taking place on April 7. Days after, the Republican National Committee urged the Supreme Court of the United States to block this ruling. He also removed the requirement for ballots to have witness signatures, citing difficulties with regards to individuals living alone during the stay-at-home order being unable to find a witness. The Supreme Court of the United States, on April 6, overturned Conley's ruling, meaning that all absentee ballots must be turned in by the election day, and ballots without witness signatures would be invalidated. However, the Supreme Court of the United States did not overturn Conley's ruling that results would not be reported until April 13.

Governor Evers, in early April, urged the state legislature to postpone the April 7 elections in Wisconsin. However, the legislature did not take the action to do this. Despite admitting that he would violate the law by doing so, on April 6, Evers issued an executive order which, if enforced, would have postponed the April 7 elections until the tentative date of June 7. Republican leaders immediately announced that they would challenge the order in the Wisconsin Supreme Court. The Wisconsin Supreme Court ruled that Evers did not have the authority to postpone the elections, thus meaning that Evers' executive order was nullified, and that the elections would be held as scheduled on April 7.

On April 4, Lena Taylor filed a lawsuit attempting to get the mayoral election moved to September 8.

By the time the Election Day voting concluded, Milwaukee Election Commissioner Neil Albrecht stated that despite some of the problems, the in-person voting ran smoothly.

Candidates
 Tom Barrett, incumbent mayor 
 Lena Taylor, State Senator from the 4th District

Endorsements

Polls

 Hamilton vs. Zielinski

Results
77,729 mail-in ballots were returned, and 18,803 in-person votes were cast in the city of Milwaukee.

See also
 2020 Wisconsin elections

References

External links
Official campaign websites
 Barrett for Milwaukee
 Lena Taylor for Mayor

2020 Wisconsin elections
Milwaukee
2020
Government of Milwaukee